Rose Against the Odds is a 1991 two-part Australian miniseries written and directed by John Dixon. It chronicles the life of Australian Aboriginal boxer Lionel Rose.

Production
The series was conceived in 1983 and financed by the Seven Network, Film Victoria and Australian Film Finance Corporation. It was filmed in Melbourne, Los Angeles and Japan.

Cast
Paul Williams as Lionel Rose
Tony Barry as Jack Rennie
Kris McQuade as Shirley Rennie
Steve Jacobs as Frank Oakes
Telly Savalas as George Parnassus
Tsurutarô Kataoka as Fighting Harada
Vikki Blanche as Jenny Oakes
Frankie J. Holden as Tom Price
Rhonda Roberts as Gina Rose
Lorraine Mafi-Williams as Adelaide Rose
Alan Campbell as Young Lionel
Jie Pitman as Young Michael
David Wirrpanda as Young Ted
Jacinta Stapleton as Young Jenny
Tim Sullivan as Reporter
Bob Ansett as Reg Ansett

References

External links

1991 films
1990s Australian television miniseries
1991 Australian television series debuts
1991 Australian television series endings
Indigenous Australian television series